West Main Street Historic District is a national historic district located at Lincolnton, Lincoln County, North Carolina. It encompasses 18 contributing buildings in a predominantly residential section of Lincolnton.  It includes notable examples of Federal, Greek Revival and Colonial Revival style architecture dating between about 1819 and 1941. Located in the district is the separately listed Shadow Lawn. Other notable buildings include the Michal-Butt-Brown-Pressly House (c. 1819), William H. Michal House (c. 1854), Rouser-Hildebrand-Burgin House (c. 1842), Robert Steve Reinhardt House (c. 1925), and Charles Hoover, Jr., House (c. 1941).

It was listed on the National Register of Historic Places in 2003.

References

Historic districts on the National Register of Historic Places in North Carolina
Greek Revival architecture in North Carolina
Federal architecture in North Carolina
Colonial Revival architecture in North Carolina
Buildings and structures in Lincoln County, North Carolina
National Register of Historic Places in Lincoln County, North Carolina